The Ministry of Defence (MoD) (IAST: Rakshā Mantrālaya) is charged with coordinating and supervising all agencies and functions of the government relating directly to national security and the Indian Armed Forces. 
The President of India is the ceremonial commander-in-chief of the armed forces of the country. The Ministry of Defence provides policy framework and resources to the armed forces to discharge their responsibility in the context of the defence of the country. The Indian Armed Forces (including Indian Army, Indian Air Force, Indian Navy) and Indian Coast Guard under the Ministry of Defence are primarily responsible for ensuring the territorial integrity of India. 

As per Statista, MoD is the largest employer in the world with 2.92 million employers.

At present, the undergoing new creation of National Defence University, for training of military officials and concerned civilian officials, will be administered and overseen by the Ministry. The Ministry organises and runs Republic Day celebrations and parade every year in January, hosting a chief guest. The Ministry has the largest budget among the federal departments of India and currently stands third in military expenditure in the world, among countries of the world.

History
A Military Department was created in the Supreme Government of the English East India Company at Kolkata in the year 1776, having the main function to sift and record orders relating to the Army issued by various Departments of the Government of East India Company. The Military Department initially functioned as a branch of the Public Department and maintained a list of Army personnel.

With the Charter Act 1833, the Secretariat of the Government of the East India Company was reorganised into four departments, each headed by a secretary to the Government. The armies in the presidencies of Bengal, Bombay and Madras functioned as the respective presidency armies until April 1895, when the presidency armies were unified into a single Indian Army. For administrative convenience, it was divided into four commands: Punjab (including the North West Frontier), Bengal (including Burma), Madras and Bombay (including Sindh, Quetta and Aden).

The supreme authority over the Indian Army was vested in the Governor General-in-Council, subject to the control of the Crown, which was exercised by the Secretary of State for India. Two members in the council were responsible for military affairs. One was the Military Member, who supervised all administrative and financial matters. The other was the commander-in-chief who was responsible for all operational matters. The Military Department was abolished in March 1906 and was replaced by two separate departments; the Army Department and the Military Supply Department. In April 1909 the Military Supply Department was abolished and its functions were taken over by the Army Department. The Army Department was redesignated as the Defence Department in January 1938. The Department of Defence became the Ministry of Defence under a cabinet minister in August 1947.

Post independences changes
The functions of MoD which in 1947 was mainly logistic support to the armed forces, has undergone far reaching changes. In November 1962, following the 1962 war, a Department of Defence Production was set-up to deal with research, development and production of defence equipment. In November 1965, the Department of Defence Supplies was created for planning and execution of schemes for import substitution of requirements for defence purposes. These two Departments were later merged to form the Department of Defence Production and Supplies.

In 1980, the Department of Defence Research and Development was created. In January 2004, the Department of Defence Production and Supplies was renamed the Department of Defence Production. A Scientific Adviser to the Defence Minister was appointed to advise on scientific aspects of military equipment and the research and design of defence forces equipment. The Department of Ex-Servicemen Welfare was created in 2004.

Organisation

Departments
The Ministry of Defence consists of five departments; Department of Defence (DoD), Department of Military Affairs (DMA), Department of Defence Production (DDP), Department of Defence Research and Development (DRDO), and Department of Ex-Servicemen Welfare (DESW). The Defence Secretary of India functions as head of the Department of Defence, and is additionally responsible for coordinating the activities of the departments in the ministry.

The principal functions of all the departments are as follows:
 The Department of Defence, headed by the Defence Secretary, the department deals with the defence of India including defence policy, preparation for defence, acts conducive to prosecution of war, the Reserves of the Army, Navy and Air Force, Defence Accounts, Indian Coast Guard, Border Roads Organization, capital acquisitions for defence and various establishment matters. It is also responsible for the Institute for Defence Studies and Analysis, National Defence College and any other organisation within the Ministry of Defence whose remit is broader than military matters. It is also responsible for the Defence Budget, matters relating to the Parliament, defence cooperation with foreign countries and coordination of all activities. 
 The Department of Military Affairs, is responsible for managing the armed forces of India, namely, the Army, the Navy and the Air Force. It is also responsible for the Territorial Army. It is headed by the Chief of Defence Staff as its secretary. It deals with procurement exclusive to the Indian Armed Forces except capital acquisitions. It is designed to promote jointness among the military services of India. This department was approved on 24 December 2019. and the responsibilities notified by Cabinet Secretariat order on 30 December 2019.
 The Department of Defence Production, headed by the Defence Production Secretary, the department was set up in November 1962 and is responsible for matters pertaining to defence production, planning and control of departmental production units of the Ordnance Factories Board, indigenisation of imported stores equipment and spares, and for defence public sector undertakings (HAL, BEL, BEML, BDL, MDL, GSL, GRSE, Midhani).
 The Department of Defence Research and Development is headed by the Defence Research and Development Secretary and ex-officio chairperson of Defence Research and Development Organisation. The department was formed in 1958, after the three-way merger of Technical Development Establishment of the Indian Army, the Directorate of Technical Development and Production, and the Defence Science Organisation. The department is responsible for the Defence Research and Development Organisation.
 The Department of Ex-servicemen Welfare (DESW) is headed by the Ex-Servicemen Welfare Secretary. The department was set up in 2004 to look after veteran affairs. The Directorate General of Resettlement, the Kendriya Sainik Board and Ex-Servicemen Contributory Health Scheme come under the purview of DESW.

Universities and institutes
Institute for Defence Studies and Analyses, Defence Institute of Advanced Technology, Defence Institute of Psychological Research and National Defence University come under administration and purview of the Ministry of Defence.

Inter-services organisations

Integrated Defence Staff

To ensure a high degree of synergy between the Armed forces, the Government has set up the Integrated Defence Staff, headed by the Chief of Integrated Defence Staff as the chairman. It was created on 1 October 2001 based on the recommendations of the Group of Ministers which was set up in 2000 (post-Kargil) to review India's defence management. It acts as the point organisation for integration of policy, doctrine, war-fighting and procurement by employing best management practices. The chairman of Integrated Defences Staff is a 4-star General (or his equivalent in the Air Force or the Navy).

The first Chief of Defence Staff was General Bipin Rawat, who took over on 1 January 2020.

Chiefs of Staff Committee
"Chiefs of Staff are the authority for advising the Defence Minister and normally through him the Cabinet Committee on Political Affairs on all military matters which require ministerial consideration". The Integrated Defence Staff is '"the principal arm and Secretariat to the Chiefs of Staff Committee".

Composition 
The Chiefs of Staff Committee is composed of: (a) Chief of the Army Staff (COAS); (b) Chief of the Naval Staff (CNS); (c) Chief of the Air Staff (CAS); and (d) Chief of Defence Staff (CDS) (non-voting member). The Scientific Adviser to the Minister of Defence is invited to attend whenever needed.

The senior most member of the COSC is appointed its chairperson. General Bipin Rawat was the last head of COSC.

The position of COSC has ceased to exit with the creation of Chief of Defence Staff.

General Bipin Rawat was appointed the first Chief of Defence Staff in 2019. He died in a helicopter crash on 8 December 2021.

Role
The responsibility for national defence "rests with the Cabinet, which is discharged through the Ministry of Defence, which provides the policy framework and wherewithal to the Armed Forces to discharge their responsibilities in the context of the defence of the country. The Raksha Mantri (Defence Minister) is the head of the Ministry of Defence."

The Defence Ministry is responsible for "obtaining policy directions of the Government on all defence and security related matters" and communicating these directions to "Services Headquarters, Inter-Services Organisations, Production Establishments and Research and Development Organisations". The MoD works closely with the National Security Council, Ministry of External Affairs and the Ministry of Home Affairs.

Ministers
MoD is headed by the Minister of Defence, who is supported by one, or more than one, minister of state.

Senior officials
There are about 400,000 defence civilians, under the MOD including Ministry of Finance personnel attached to MOD.

Defence Secretary, other senior officials and Scientific Adviser to Defence Minister

The ministers are supported by a number of civilian, scientific and military advisers.

The Defence Secretary as head of the Department of Defence, is the senior most civil servant in the ministry and is responsible for coordinating the activities of the four departments in the ministry. His/her role is to ensure that the MoD operates effectively as a department of the government. Defence Secretary is assisted by additional secretaries and joint secretaries to Government of India posted in the ministry. The Defence Secretary, generally, is an officer from the Indian Administrative Service, apart from the Defence Secretary, there are three other secretary-level posts in the Ministry of Defence.

Scientific Adviser to Defence Minister plays a key role in formulation of research and development policies and promoting self-reliance in Indian defence industries.

Civil services under MoD

Finance Division
The Finance Division of the Ministry of Defence is headed by the Financial Adviser (Defence Services). He or she exercises financial control over proposals involving expenditure from the Defence Budget and is responsible for the internal audit and accounting of defence expenditure. In the latter tasks, he or she is assisted by the Controller General of Defence Accounts.

Chiefs of the tri-services and Defence Staff
In 1955, the title of Commander-in-Chief was abolished and the three service chiefs were designated as the Chief of the Army Staff, the Chief of the Naval Staff and the Chief of the Air Staff. The heads of the three services of Indian Armed Forces are:
Chief of Defence Staff — General Anil Chauhan
Chief of the Army Staff — General Manoj Pandey
Chief of the Naval Staff — Admiral Radhakrishnan Hari Kumar
Chief of the Air Staff — Air Chief Marshal Vivek Ram Chaudhari

Vice Chiefs of the tri-services
Vice Chief of the Army Staff — Lieutenant General B. S. Raju
Vice Chief of the Naval Staff — Vice Admiral Satish Namdeo Ghormade
Vice Chief of the Air Staff — Air Marshal Amar Preet Singh

Initiatives

SRIJAN portal
The SRIJAN is a portal launched by MoD in order to take up the products imported for indigenization. According to Ministry; it displays defence products that have been imported recently and will tag with the Defence Public sector undertakings, Ordinance Factory Board and others in order to push for its domestic manufacturing for exports in future.

See also
 National Defence College (India)
 Military Institute of Technology (MILIT), Pune
 Defence Research and Development Organisation
 Indian Naval Academy
 Chief of Defence (India)
 Ministry of external affairs

References

External links

 Official Website Ministry of Defence, India
 Official Website of Department of Defence Production
 Official Website of Defence Research and Development Organisation
 Annual Report for the year 2016–17
 Defence Directory of Important Web Links of MOD
 Official Website of the Integrated Defence Staff
 Sainik Samachar Armed Forces News

  Defence Exam News
 

 
India
Defence
Military of India